The Tiger Hills Hockey League (THHL) is a senior ice hockey league that operates in the southwestern region of Manitoba, Canada. The league was formed on October 6, 1982 and first began play in the 1983-1984 hockey season.

It operates under the sanction of Hockey Manitoba, the provincial branch of Hockey Canada. The league champion advances to the Manitoba Senior 'A' Provincial Championship.

Select regular season and playoff games are broadcast on Boissevain based radio station CJRB.

Teams

Active Teams 
 Boissevain Border Kings 
 Cartwright Clippers 
 Deloraine Royals 
 Gladstone Lakers 
 Hartney Blues 
 Killarney Shamrocks 
 MacGregor Wild 
 Melita Bisons 
 Minnedosa Bombers 
 Neepawa Farmers 
 Souris Elks 
 Pilot Mound Pilots 
 Wawanesa Jets

Defunct or Inactive Teams 
 Baldur Barons
 Carberry Plainsmen
 Cartwright-Baldur Clippers
 Glenboro Nordics
 Holland Rockets
 Swan Lake Cougars

League Champions

References

External links
League Website

Hockey Manitoba
Ice hockey leagues in Manitoba
Senior ice hockey
1982 establishments in Manitoba
Sports leagues established in 1982